
The following is a list of Playboy Playmates of 1957.  Playboy magazine names its Playmate of the Month each month throughout the year.

January

June Blair (born Margaret June Blair; October 20, 1933) is an American model and actress. She is best known for being Playboy magazine's Playmate of the Month for its January 1957 issue. Her centerfold was photographed by Hal Adams.

February

Sally Todd (born Sarah Joan Todd; June 7, 1934) is an American actress and model. She was Playboy magazine's Playmate of the Month for the February 1957 issue. Her centerfold was photographed by David Sutton and Ed DeLong.

March

Sandra Edwards (March 12, 1938 - June 2, 2017) is an American actress and model. She was Playboy magazine's Playmate of the Month for the March 1957 issue. Her centerfold was photographed by Peter Gowland. Her name is usually spelled Saundra Edwards.

April

Gloria Windsor (born 1935) is an American model. She was Playboy magazine's Playmate of the Month for the April 1957 issue. Her centerfold was photographed by Hal Adams.

May

Dawn Richard (born March 5, 1936) is an American model and actress. She was Playboy magazine's Playmate of the Month for the May 1957 issue. Her centerfold was photographed by Ed DeLong and David Sutton.

June

Carrie Radison (born November 1, 1938) is an American model and actress. She was Playboy magazine's Playmate of the Month for the June 1957 issue. Her centerfold was photographed by Desmond Russell.

July

Jean Jani (born October 31, 1931) is an American model. She was Playboy magazine's Playmate of the Month for the July 1957 issue. Her centerfold was photographed by Peter Gowland.

August

Dolores Donlon (born Patricia Vaniver; September 19, 1920 – November 30, 2012) was an American model and actress. She was Playboy magazine's Playmate of the Month for the August 1957 issue.  Her centerfold was photographed by Peter Gowland.

September

Jacquelyn Prescott (born 1936) is an American model. She was Playboy magazine's Playmate of the Month for the September 1957 issue. Her centerfold was photographed by Mario Casili, the first Playmate of his long career with Playboy.

October

Colleen Farrington (August 5, 1936 – October 12, 2015) was an American model and nightclub singer. She was Playboy magazine's Playmate of the Month for the October 1957 issue.  Her centerfold was photographed by Peter Basch.

Farrington died in Jupiter, Florida, at the age of 79. She is the mother of Academy Award-nominated actress Diane Lane.

November

Marlene Callahan (born August 24, 1937) is an American model, actress and photographer. She was Playboy magazine's Playmate of the Month for the November 1957 issue. Her centerfold was photographed by Vivienne Lapham.

December

Linda Vargas (born April 20, 1939) is an American model. She was Playboy magazine's Playmate of the Month for the December 1957 issue. Her centerfold was photographed by Herbert Melford and Mike Shea.

Vargas, who began modeling when she was a teenager, had a steady career before and after her Playmate appearance as a model and bit actress. Frequent Playboy photographer Peter Gowland used images of her in many of his instruction books.

See also
 List of people in Playboy 1953–1959

References

1957-related lists
Playmates Of 1957